TNS can stand for:

Places 
 Tungsten (Cantung) Airport, Tungsten, Northwest Territories, Canada
 Tao Nan School, a primary school in Singapore
 , the National Theatre of Strasbourg, France

Groups 
 The New Saints F.C., a Welsh football club, formerly Total Network Solutions F.C.
 Taylor Nelson Sofres, a market research company
 TechnoServe, a US-based international development non-profit group
 TNSrecords, a British punk rock/ska record label
 Transaction Network Services, a data communications company
 Triple Nine Society, a high IQ organisation
 The Naturist Society, a Naturist Network promoting Nude Recreation

Other 
 The Natural Step, a sustainability framework
 Transparent Network Substrate, an Oracle database technology
 Transcutaneous electrical nerve stimulation, also known as TENS